{{DISPLAYTITLE:C10H15NO3}}
The molecular formula C10H15NO3 (molar mass: 197.23 g/mol) may refer to:

 2-Carbomethoxytropinone
 DME (psychedelic)
 Ethylnorepinephrine
 Metanephrine
 Tenuazonic acid
 2,4,5-Trihydroxymethamphetamine